KSHV may refer to:

 KSHV-TV, a television station (channel 16, virtual 45) licensed to Shreveport, Louisiana, United States
 The ICAO airport code for the Shreveport Regional Airport
 Kaposi's sarcoma-associated herpesvirus (KSHV or HHV-8)